Lecithocera bipunctella is a moth in the family Lecithoceridae. It was described by Snellen in 1903. It is found in Indonesia (Java).

The wingspan is about 22 mm. The forewings are brownish-yellow, with a somewhat lighter margin and a black dot in the middle of the cell, and another under the cross vein. The hindwings are light yellowish-grey.

References

Moths described in 1903
bipunctella